Klaus Føge Jensen (born 11 December 1944) is a Danish sailor. He competed in the Tempest event at the 1972 Summer Olympics.

References

External links
 

1944 births
Living people
Danish male sailors (sport)
Olympic sailors of Denmark
Sailors at the 1972 Summer Olympics – Tempest
People from Hedensted Municipality
Sportspeople from the Central Denmark Region